The Cape Muslim Congress is a South African Muslim political party active in Cape Town and led by founder Yagyah Adams. It won a single seat in the City of Cape Town in 2011, and again in 2016, taken up by Adams.

The party favours the reinstatement of the death penalty, and supports castration for violent offenders.

Election results

Municipal elections

References

1994 establishments in South Africa
Islamic political parties in South Africa
Political parties established in 1994